James Morrison (24 March 1936 – 4 August 2018) was a New Zealand cricketer. He played in three first-class matches for Wellington from 1958 to 1960.

See also
 List of Wellington representative cricketers

References

External links
 

1936 births
2018 deaths
New Zealand cricketers
Wellington cricketers
Cricketers from Wellington City